is a passenger railway station in located in the city of  Kyōtango, Kyoto Prefecture, Japan, operated by the private railway company Willer Trains (Kyoto Tango Railway).

Lines
Kyōtango-Ōmiya Station is a station of the Miyazu Line, and is located 42.7 kilometers from the terminus of the line at Nishi-Maizuru Station.

Station layout
The station has two opposed ground-level side platforms connected to the station building by a level crossing. The station is unattended.

Platforms

Adjacent stations

History
On May 24, 1963 it was renamed  , and renamed again to its present name on March 31, 2015.

Passenger statistics
In fiscal 2018, the station was used by an average of 140 passengers daily.

Surrounding area
 Kyotango City Omiya Government Building
 JA Kyoto Omiya Branch
 Ono Castle Ruins

See also
List of railway stations in Japan

References

External links

Official home page 

Railway stations in Kyoto Prefecture
Railway stations in Japan opened in 1925
Kyōtango